Chip Thomson is an American entrepreneur, inventor, golf instructor, actor, writer, radio and television personality. His inventions include 3rdiView, LiverSaver, Money Clamp, Windzone Motorcycle Toolkits, ZCLIP, and The Honey Do. He has coached PGA Tour golfers at the U.S. Open, PGA Championship, and Tour Championship.

Early life and career
Thomson was born in New Orleans, Louisiana and grew up in Jacksonville, Illinois. He played golf for two Illinois colleges and then returned to New Orleans where he taught golf during the day and ran a restaurant, Ichabod's, at night.

In 1984, Thomson worked for the Peterson Company, in Denver, Colorado, as a Sales Engineer, focusing on Nuclear Instrumentation for Texas Nuclear. In 1988, he became a Regional Sales Manager for Ronan Engineering, also selling nuclear process instrumentation and inventing solutions, with nuclear instrumentation, for power plants, refineries, and chemical plants.

In 1991, Thomson came to Austin, Texas and continued to coach golf to PGA Tour players. His pupils included Emlyn Aubrey, Pete Jordan, Brandel Chamblee, Tom Purtzer, and Joel Edwards. In 2002, Thomson participated in the Drambuie World Ice Golf Championship. In addition, Thomson has recruited, played in, and helped organize the Mexican Open.

He is the founder and president of Austin-based Beza LLP. He also founded Blue Chip Promotions in 1997.

Inventions
Thomson's first inventions were Windzone Motorcycle Tool Kits, followed by The Money Clamp, a cross between a binder and money clip. He also created 3rdiView, a video device that allows an athlete to watch his or her performance through a live video feed. 

In 2011, Thomson invented the ZCLIP, a carbon fiber money clip/wallet combination. He also invented software used to predict the outcome of sporting events.

In 2014, Thomson invented LiverSaver, which helps decrease the effects alcohol has on the liver and other organs.

Acting

Thomson has written articles for golf websites and magazines, and has appeared as an on-air sports television analyst. He has hosted for shows such as Chip Shots and Eye on the Road. He is represented by Heyman Talent Agency.

In 2004, Thomson was the first on-course commentator for the PGA Tour Network on XM Radio.

As well as other TV appearances, he was the on-air Golf Analyst for CNN, CNNSI, and CBS.

Thomson appeared in the television series From Dusk till Dawn and is set to appear in the feature film Shooter's Nail.

Personal life
Thomson has been married and divorced.

Bibliography

References

External links

American golf instructors
Businesspeople from Illinois
American inventors
1957 births
Living people